Duggan Park is a GAA stadium in Ballinasloe, County Galway, Ireland. 

The ground, named after Bishop of Clonfert Patrick Duggan, was opened in 1934 and has a capacity of 3,000.

See also
 List of Gaelic Athletic Association stadiums
 List of stadiums in Ireland by capacity

References

Buildings and structures in County Galway
Gaelic games grounds in the Republic of Ireland
Galway GAA
Sports venues in County Galway